Homegrown is the New Zealand compilation album released in 2004 by the NZ Idol The Final 10.

Track listing
Yesterday Was Just the Beginning of My Life - The Final 10
Sitting Inside My Head - Luke Whaanga
Better - Dave Houma
Better Be Home Soon - Michael Murphy
Escaping - Camillia Temple
A Life With You - Filipo Saipani
Misty Frequencies - Eddie Gaiger
I Hope I Never - Jessie Cassin
You Oughta Be In Love - Ben Lummis
Time Makes the Wine - Sela Mahe
Don't Dream It's Over - Robin Johnson

Charts

References

Compilation albums by New Zealand artists
2004 compilation albums